Administrative structures for municipal governments can be found on Antigua and Barbuda. It also has 17 district councils in addition to its workforce for the local government. Under the direction of the Local Government Officer, the district councils have been categorized into a total of four (4) distinct zones. At a more fundamental level, Voluntary Village Councils are strongly urged to encourage the participation of as many citizens as is humanly practicable. After that, they are consolidated into several district councils. The borders of national constituencies are mirrored in district council limits. The island of Barbuda was granted a unique status, and it was given the authority to solicit financial contributions in order to meet the needs of its inhabitants. 

There are at least five members that make up the district council, and among those members, a chairman and secretary/treasurer are elected. The member of parliament who represents that constituency automatically has a seat in the committee as an ex-officio member. The responsibility for providing service to three (3) councils is shared between one officer of the local government and his assistant.

Outside of Barbuda, there is no activity at all on the part of administration at the local level.

Barbuda Council 
There is an active and functioning Barbuda Council, which has authority over the island of Barbuda. It is an elected body enshrined in the Constitution.

Proposed Parish Councils 
There has not been any form of parish government in Antigua and Barbuda since the parish vestry system became defunct in the late 1600s. The parishes do, however, have some restricted powers, such as the issuing of papers. Antigua is administratively divided into parishes, which are also known as civil parishes.

Asot Michael Parish Council Proposals (2023 elections) 
Asot Michael claimed in his manifesto that one of his first priorities as MP for Saint Peter would be to establish a "modern" system of parish councils within the first sixty days of his election. In his manifesto, he proposed that parish councils receive their money from property taxes. This was one of his proposals. Michael also proposed the establishment of a Saint Peter Parish Council; however, the geographic boundaries of this particular parish are unknown. This is because Long Island is sometimes considered to be part of both Saint George and Saint Peter, and the boundaries of the St. Peter Constituency are distinct from those of the Saint Peter Parish. As an independent candidate, Michael was successful in winning the election for his seat.

DNA Parish Council Proposals (2023 elections) 
The Democratic National Alliance campaigned on the promise that it will repeal the "Local Government Act" and replace existing municipal governments with a network of parish councils. The minority political group is working toward the goal of constructing a Council Administrative Headquarters and taking powers away from the central government. In the event that they did win the election, they planned to establish Parish Councils in each parish, with the exception of Saint John Parish, which contains the majority of the country's population. Saint John Parish would instead be transformed into a municipality and would be led by a Mayor in this scenario. In the 16th parliament, the DNA was not successful in gaining any seats.

Zones 
Antigua and Barbuda has four zones. While these zones have no local government purpose, they are under the supervision of the Local Government Officer.

District Councils 
Antigua and Barbuda has 17 inactive district councils which correspond to the borders of parliamentary constituencies.

Village Councils

References 
 

Government of Antigua and Barbuda